The Philippines' Agricultural Training Institute (abbreviated as ATI), is an agency of the Philippine government under the Department of Agriculture responsible for training agricultural extension workers and their clientele; conducting multi-level training programs to promote and accelerate rural development; and ensuring that research results are communicated to the farmers through appropriate training and extension activities.

History
When the Ministry of Agriculture and Food was reorganized in January 1987 under the Executive Order No. 116, the Bureau of Agricultural Extension (BAEx), the Philippine Agricultural Training Council (PATC) and the Philippine Training Centers for Rural Development (PTC-RD) merged, and paved the way for the establishment of the Agricultural Training Institute (ATI).

The ATI started with ten training centers from the former PTC-RD when it became operational in 1987. A year after, the number of training centers nationwide rose to 26 when nine Regional Training Centers (RTC) and seven Farmers’ Training Centers (FTC) were set up.

In 1989, there was a total of 41 training centers nationwide after seven FTCs, seven Regional Fishermen's Training Centers (RFTC) and the International Training Center on Pig Husbandry (ITCPH) were installed.

ATI's role as the DA's extension and training arm was strengthened with the Republic Act 8435 or the Agriculture and Fisheries Modernization Act (AFMA) of 1997. But in November 1998, the RFTCs were turned over to the Bureau of Fisheries and Aquatic Resources. Also, the FTCs were renamed Provincial Training Centers.

At present, ATI, being the extension and training arm of the Philippine Department of Agriculture, is geographically situated nationwide to be able to reach its target clientele in the agriculture and fisheries sector. It has 16 regional training centers and one international training center, with its Central Office located at Diliman, Quezon City, Philippines.

Agriculture and Fisheries Extension Thematic Programs

 Enhancing Access to Agriculture and Fisheries Extension Knowledge Products and Services
 Strengthening Competitiveness and Capacities of the Agriculture and Fisheries Sector
 Expanding Partnerships in Advancing Excellence in Agriculture and Fisheries Extension Delivery
 Scaling-up Agriculture and Fisheries Extension Innovations
 Strengthening Agriculture and Fisheries Extension Stakeholders' Capacity in Climate Change Resilience
 Improving Enabling Environment and Quality of Governance

Major Services

 Technology Demonstration
 Farm and Business Advisory through the Farmers' Contact Center (FCC)
 Technical Assistance to Rural-based Organizations
 Provision of multimedia IEC materials at the Agriculture and Fisheries Knowledge Center
 e-Extension services through e-learning courses on A & F and digital learning resources
 Accreditation of Extension Services Providers (ESPs)
 Provision of extension grants to accredited ESPs
 Provision of grants for policy research on extension

References

Sources
 Performance of Philippine Agriculture, January-March 2018 | Philippine Statistics Authority
 Philippine Statistics Authority | Republic of the Philippines
 Agriculture is dying in the Philippines
 Agricultural output slows down in 1st quarter of 2018

External links
ATI Interactive

Department of Agriculture (Philippines)
Establishments by Philippine executive order